Destiny is a 2006 Turkish drama film, produced, written and directed by Zeki Demirkubuz, starring Vildan Atasever as a bar singer who is in love with a somewhat unstable criminal. It is a prequel to Innocence (1997).

Plot 
Uğur (Vildan Atasever) is a bar singer who is in love with a somewhat unstable criminal, Zagor (Ozan Bilen). Her father is seriously ill and her young mother is emotionally distant. Cevat (Engin Akyürek) is a young man who had taken under his protection Uğur's family. Cevat is the beloved of Uğur's young mother. Uğur's younger is bullied at the coffee shop where he works. Cevat protects him and warns the people at the coffee shop not to bully him or else. The day comes when the boy is bullied again. Cevat goes to his aid and beats up Kamil. Zagor breaks the fight up and tells his men to take Kamil outside. Zagor and Cevat start arguing, then Cevat pulls out a gun and is ultimately killed by Zagor in his attempt to prove that he did not fear Zagor. Bekir (Ufuk Bayraktar) is a young man who runs his father's business. He becomes infatuated with Uğur after she visits his shop one day. After a series of violent incidents and mishaps occur in Istanbul, both Uğur and Zagor disappear. They resurface after shooting two policemen and getting caught in Izmir. After Zagor is landed in prison some time afterward, Uğur reappears and asks Bekir to help her. Meanwhile, Zagor is transferred to a prison in Sinop. Uğur tries to trace Zagor who has escaped from prison as Bekir tries to trace Uğur.

Awards 
Kader won several awards including the Golden Orange and Golden Tulip for best film and also for its acting and screenplay

Golden Orange awards
 Best film, Best actor (Ufuk Bayraktar)

Ankara film festival
 Best actress (Vildan Atasever), Best director (Zeki Demirkubuz), Best supporting actress (Müge Ulusoy)

Nuremberg film festival
 Best film (Jury), Audience award

Istanbul film festival
 Golden Tulip for best film, Best director (Zeki Demirkubuz), Best actor (Ufuk Bayraktar)

Contemporary Screen Actors Association (CASOD) awards
 Most Promising Actor (Engin Akyurek)

The Cinema Writers Association (SIYAD) Awards
 Most Promising Actor (Engin Akyurek)

References

External links
 
 
 Filmpot Distributor page for the film

2006 drama films
2006 films
Films set in Turkey
Films shot in Turkey
Films directed by Zeki Demirkubuz
Films scored by Eduard Artemyev
Golden Orange Award for Best Film winners
Turkish drama films
2000s Turkish-language films